This was the first edition of the tournament.

Quirine Lemoine won the title, defeating Yana Morderger in the final, 7–5, 6–4.

Seeds

Draw

Finals

Top half

Bottom half

References

Main Draw

Amstelveen Women's Open - Singles